Luci is a given name and a family name.

Luci may also refer to:

 Lunar Ultraviolet Cosmic Imager, a planned lunar-based telescope
 LuCI, a web-based interface for the OpenWrt router operating system
 LUCI, the near-infrared instrument for the Large Binocular Telescope
 Paranitocris luci, a species of beetle in the family Cerambycidae
 Luci Island, Xiuyu District, Putian, Fujian, China
 Luci (lantern) a rechargeable LED lantern powered by sunlight

See also
 Lusi (disambiguation)
 Lucy (disambiguation)
 Luce (disambiguation)
 Lucie (disambiguation)
 Luciana (disambiguation)
 Lucifer (disambiguation)